Ferrari America is a series of top-end Ferrari models built in the 1950s and 1960s. They were large grand touring cars with the largest V12 engines and often had custom bodywork. All America models used a live axle in the rear, were front-engined, and had worm and sector steering.

Two of the series, the 410 and the 400, were called Superamerica.  The final member of the America production family was called the 500 Superfast.  The series also includes the 365 California.



340 America

The first America cars were the 340, produced between 1950 and 1952. Using the new Lampredi V12 developed for Formula One racing, the 340 America could produce . Originally only 23 copies were built: 11 by Vignale, eight by Touring, and four by Ghia. Giovanni Michelotti designed Coupé and 2+2 Coupé for Ghia and Coupé and Spider for Vignale. The first two Americas were converted from the 275 S. In 1951, 340 America Vignale Berlinetta won Mille Miglia race driven by Luigi Villoresi. Three Touring barchettas were also entered that year but did not finish.

The 340/342 America was replaced by its larger-engined brother, the 375 America.

342 America

Only six road cars were made: Vignale Cabriolet (designed by Giovanni Michelotti), two Pinin Farina Cabriolets and three Pinin Farina Coupés. Last example, the Pinin Farina Cabriolet s/n 0248AL presented at 1953 New York Auto show, was upgraded to 4.5 L engine. Both 340/342 Americas used even chassis numbering of a race cars, while 375 America and later used odd chassis numbering of a road cars. A Black Pinin Farina Cabriolet was owned by King Leopold III of Belgium.

375 America

The 375 America was introduced in 1953 and a Pinin Farina bodied example was shown at that year's Paris Salon. The 375 and later used odd chassis numbering of a road cars, while the 340/342 Americas using even chassis numbering of a race cars. The 375 was expensive and exclusive and was only built from late 1953 through 1954. 12 cars were made, with ten being original 375s and two being 250 Europas that were subsequently converted to 375 specifications (the 250 Europa and 375 had a nearly identical wheelbase, chassis and mechanicals). The majority of 375s had either three or five-window coupe bodies by Pinin Farina, though Vignale bodied around three Coupés and one convertible.

410 Superamerica

Ferrari produced another line of America cars, beginning with the 1955 410 Superamerica. A 1957 Superamerica series III had triple 46DCF3 Webers for even more power and was also the final development for the 'long-block' Lampredi V12.

Each 410 Superamerica had custom bodywork, with a few by Boano and Ghia but most by Ferrari stalwart, Pinin Farina. The price was extremely high—at US$16,800, the 410 Superamerica offered at the New York Auto Show by importer Luigi Chinetti was more than twice as expensive as the Mercedes-Benz 300SL "Gullwing" exhibited by Max Hoffman. Just 35 were built when the series ended in 1959. First 2 series of Pinin Farina coupés were very similar with only 3rd series radically redesigned with non-panoramic rear window, different side-line, lower front grille and more recessed headlights, some covered. While most 3rd series PF coupés had 3 louvres behind side-windows, some have this space glassed over. Series III cars were introduced in 1958.

410 Superfast Pinin Farina Speciale
Also known as "Superfast I", made on 410 Superamerica chassis with 24-plug racing engine from 410 S, prominent tailfins and bi-coloured body. It was unveiled at the 1956 Paris Auto Show. Wheelbase was shorter at 2,600 mm.

4.9 Superfast
Another show car based on 410 Superamerica chassis and engine was Ferrari 4.9 Superfast. First time presented in Paris, 1957, this car was an evolution of 410 Superfast but without the prominent rear fins. Also the colours were similar but with dark blue-green full body and white roof.

400 Superamerica

The 400 Superamerica had a smaller 4.0 L Colombo engine, but produced as much power as its predecessor,  at 7,000 rpm. It debuted in 1959 as 410 production ended, and was available as a coupe, spider, or cabriolet with custom Pinin Farina bodywork. Four-wheel disc brakes were a new addition. 47 Ferrari 400s had been built, along 2 series, when the 400 stepped aside in 1964, of which 32 were coupé aerodinamico variant. Series I coupés aerodinamico had open hood air scoop while series II cars had covered scoop and slightly longer wheelbase.

400 Superamerica Pinin Farina Coupé Speciale
A special one-off version of the 400 Superamerica, s/n 1517SA, was built in 1959 for Gianni Agnelli. This car was also the very first of the 400 Superamericas. A very similar body with its characteristic square grille, was used on Maserati 5000 GT that was also built for Sig. Agnelli.

400 Superamerica Superfast II–IV
Originally built as series I Ferrari 400 Superamerica Aerodinamico Pinin Farina Coupé, chassis no. 2207SA, was bodied and presented as Superfast II at the Torino Motor Show in 1960 and 1961. It was used by Battista "Pinin" Farina as his personal car. In 1961 rebodied into Superfast III and presented at 1962 Geneva Motor Show. Same year redesigned another, final, time as Superfast IV. It was a styling concept for the upcoming 500 Superfast model. Currently this show car can be seen on various events with its first styling.

500 Superfast

The end of the top-line America series was the 500 Superfast, first shown on the Pininfarina stand at the March 1964 Geneva Motor Show. During development these cars were to be called "Superamerica", but the decision was made at the last moment to use "Superfast" instead.

The engine was a unique  Ferrari Colombo V12 engine, which had the same 108 mm bore center dimensions as the Lampredi "long-block" engines of the 410 Superamerica, otherwise the design was based on the original Colombo "short block". The chassis was very similar in construction to the contemporary 330 GT 2+2, and bodywork was again done by Pininfarina. When leaving the factory the 500 Superfast originally fitted Pirelli Cinturato CN72 205 VR15 tyres.
36 cars were made from 1964 to 1966, including 12 improved models with a 5-speed transmission in place of the earlier 4-speed plus overdrive. This production total excludes a one-off 330 GT 2+2 produced with a Superfast-style body for Prince Bernhard of The Netherlands. This one-off car sold at Bonhams' December 2003 Geneva auction for CHF 422,100 inc. premium. Only coupés were made and no Superfast roadsters were available.

365 California

The 365 California replaced the 500 Superfast for 1966. It was the first 365 model, with its  V12 based on the 330's 4.0 L Colombo unit but with an 81 mm bore. The 365 California used the same chassis as the 500 Superfast but with an evolutionary cabriolet body by Pininfarina. Debuting at the Geneva Motor Show in 1966, just 14 examples were produced (including 2 in right hand drive) before production ended in 1967. Whilst the prototype was built on a 330 GT 2+2 type 571 chassis, production cars featured type 598 chassis. Chassis' were sent to Pininfarina's Grugliasco plant to be bodied and trimmed which were later returned to Ferrari for fitment of the mechanical components.

References

Bibliography

External links

 Ferrari 340 America: Ferrari History
 Ferrari 375 America: Ferrari History
 Ferrari 410 Superamerica: Ferrari History
 Ferrari 400 Superamerica: Ferrari History
 Ferrari 500 Superfast: Ferrari History
 Ferrari 365 California: Ferrari History

America
Sports cars
1950s cars
1960s cars
24 Hours of Le Mans race cars
Mille Miglia
Pininfarina